The 1945 Washington Huskies football team represented the University of Washington in the Pacific Coast Conference (PCC) during the 1945 college football season. Home games were played on campus in Seattle at Husky Stadium.

Under fourth-year head coach Ralph Welch, the Huskies were 6–3, third in the PCC, and outscored its opponents 91 to 54. 
No non-conference games were played this season and center Bill McGovern was the team captain.

Season
After a two-year hiatus due to World War II, in-state rival Washington State resumed its program and was played twice. The games were split, with home team wins in shutouts in Seattle in October, and in Pullman at the end of the season. The Cougars had last fielded a team in 1942.

Oregon and Oregon State were also played twice, in Seattle and Portland. The Huskies swept  but split with Oregon State, with the visiting teams  The Huskies upset USC 13–7 in Seattle, the Trojans' only PCC loss. UCLA was not on the schedule this season, and Stanford did not field a team from 1943 through 1945.

Schedule

NFL Draft selections
Six University of Washington Huskies were selected in the 1946 NFL Draft, which lasted 32 rounds with 300 selections.

References

External links
 Game program: Washington at Washington State – November 24, 1945

Washington
Washington Huskies football seasons
Washington Huskies football